James Milton Turner (1840 – November 1, 1915) was a Reconstruction Era political leader, activist, educator, and diplomat. As consul general to Liberia, he was the first African-American to serve in the U.S. diplomatic corps.

Early life

Turner was born into slavery in St. Louis, Missouri. As a child, he was sold on the steps of the St. Louis US Courthouse for $50 (equivalent to $ in ).  His enslaved father, John Turner, was a "horse doctor". Allowed to keep some of his earnings, he eventually purchased freedom for himself and his family. 

At fourteen, James Turner attended Oberlin College in Ohio for one term; following his father's death in 1855, Turner had to return to St. Louis to care for his family. Turner attended John Berry Meachum's Floating Freedom School on a steamboat on the Mississippi River, which Meachum had set up to evade the 1847 Missouri law against education of blacks.

Career

When the American Civil War broke out, Turner enlisted in the Union Army and served as body servant for Col. Madison Miller. He was wounded, resulting in a permanent limp.

After the war, Miller's brother-in-law, Missouri Governor Thomas Fletcher, appointed him as assistant superintendent of schools. He was responsible for setting up schools for black Missourians.  He helped establish the Lincoln Institute in Jefferson City, the first institution of higher education for African Americans in the state. The Institute's name was later changed to Lincoln University. As a politician, Turner, an outspoken member of the Radical Republicans and a leader of the Missouri Equal Rights League, was held in high regard for his oratorical skills. In 1868 he was installed as the principal of Lincoln School, the first school for blacks in Kansas City, Missouri. He was succeeded by J. Dallas Bowser.

In 1871, Turner was appointed as consul general to Liberia by Republican President Ulysses S. Grant. He relocated to Monrovia and held that post until 1878. During this time he was involved in settling the Grebo war.

When he returned to St. Louis, Turner played an important role in helping to resettle black refugees from former Confederate states in the South. He also worked to organize freedmen and people of color free before the Civil War as a political force; they overwhelmingly joined the Republican Party, considered the party of Abraham Lincoln. Turner also took part in relief efforts for African Americans who had left the South for Kansas as part of the Exoduster Movement of 1879.  Many of these migrants settled in St. Louis.

In 1881, Turner worked with Hannibal Carter to organize the Freedmen’s Oklahoma Immigration Association to promote black homesteading in Oklahoma. As chairman of the Negro National Republican Committee, he proposed nominating US Senator Blanche Bruce, another African American, as the vice presidential candidate on the Republican ticket in 1880.

Turner worked during the last two decades of his life in fighting for the rights of Cherokee, Choctaw, and Chickasaw freedmen in the Indian Territory. After the war, the US government had made new treaties with these tribes, which had supported the Confederacy. They required the tribes to offer full citizenship to those freedmen who chose to stay in tribal territory, as the US had done for freedmen in the United States. He successfully lobbied Congress for the nearly 4,000 Cherokee Freedmen to receive $75,000 (US$  in ) from funds that the U.S. government had paid the tribe in 1888 for their land. The Cherokee originally did not want to divide the money for communal lands to include the freedmen.

Death and legacy 
In late 1915 Turner was in Ardmore, Oklahoma, representing the freedmen in a legal dispute. When a nearby railroad car exploded, the debris cut his left hand. Blood poisoning developed in the wound, and Turner died November 1, 1915 in Ardmore.

The Turner School in the Meacham Park area of Kirkwood, Missouri was named for Turner. The school opened in 1924 and was renamed after Turner in 1932; it was closed during the 1975-1976 school year in response to a federally mandated directive to address the racial isolation that its African American students were experiencing in the Kirkwood School District.

See also
1870 Missouri State Colored People's Educational Convention

Bibliography
Notes

References 
  - Total pages: 216
 

 - Total pages: 482
 - Total pages: 178
  - Total pages: 245
  - Total pages: 116

Further reading

 - Total pages: 417 

1840 births
1915 deaths
African-American people in Missouri politics
African-American educators
African-American diplomats
Ambassadors of the United States to Liberia
19th-century American slaves
People of the Reconstruction Era
People from St. Louis
People of Missouri in the American Civil War
Date of birth unknown
Missouri Republicans
Oklahoma Republicans
Educators from Missouri
19th-century American diplomats
20th-century African-American people